The Meripilaceae are a family of fungi in the order Polyporales. The family was circumscribed by Swiss mycologist Walter Jülich in 1982 with Meripilus as the type genus. A 2008 estimate placed 7 genera and 57 species in Meripilaceae. , Index Fungorum accepts 74 species in the family.

Genera

Grifola
Henningsia
Hydnopolyporus
Meripilus
Physisporinus
Pseudonadsoniella – Antarctic, Argentina, Galindez Island
Rigidoporus

References

 
Meripilaceae
Taxa named by Walter Jülich
Fungi described in 1982